Renée Florence Vilain (1816-1889), was a Belgian businessperson.

She is known for having co-founded the first Friterie in Belgium in 1844.

References

1816 births
1889 deaths
19th-century businesswomen
19th-century Belgian businesspeople